

List
Note about termini:  In several cases there is disagreement between the administrative termini of a route (which is defined by MaineDOT) and the termini signed in the field.  All termini listed on this page are administrative termini; discrepancies are listed on the respective pages.

See also

Maine Turnpike

References

External links
RoadsAroundME

 
Inter